A list of sinologists around the world, past and present. Sinology is commonly defined as the academic study of China primarily through Chinese language, literature, and history, and often refers to Western scholarship. Its origin "may be traced to the examination which Chinese scholars made of their own civilization."

The field of sinology was historically seen to be equivalent to the application of philology to China, and until the 20th century was generally seen as meaning "Chinese philology" (language and literature). Sinology has broadened in modern times to include Chinese history, epigraphy, and other subjects.

Australia

 Rafe de Crespigny
 Charles Patrick Fitzgerald
 Colin Mackerras
 Robert Henry Mathews
 John Minford
 Pierre Ryckmans
 Yingjie Guo
 Kevin Rudd

Austria
 Michael Prochazka

Belgium

 Simon Leys
 Roel Sterckx (born 1969)
 Antoine Thomas
 Ferdinand Verbiest

Bulgaria
 Snejina Gogova

Canada

 Timothy Brook
 Charles Burton
 Jerome Ch'en (born 1919)
 Edwin G. Pulleyblank
 Michael Szonyi
 Chia-ying Yeh

China

 James Dyer Ball (1847-1919)
 Yuen Ren Chao
 C. T. Hsia
 Huang Xianfan
 D. C. Lau
 Li Xueqin
 Rao Zongyi
 Qian Mu
 Qiu Xigui
 Wang Li, linguist
 Wang Tao, archaeologist
 Wang Zhongshu
 Xia Nai
 Yang Bojun

Czech Republic

 Gustav Haloun (1898–1951)
 Jaroslav Průšek (1906–1980)

Estonia
 Linnart Mäll

France

 Jean-Baptiste Du Halde (1674–1743)
 Arcade Huang (1679–1717)
 Étienne Fourmont (1683–1745)
 Jean Denis Attiret (1702–1768)
 Jean Joseph Marie Amiot (1718–1793)
 Jean-Pierre Abel-Rémusat (1788–1832) – studied languages of the Far East and produced the Essai sur la langue et la littérature chinoises, and the Chinese novel Iu-kiao-li, ou les deux cousines, roman chinois.
 Stanislas Julien (1797–1873)
 Séraphin Couvreur (1835–1919)
 Léopold de Saussure (1886–1925)
 Léon Wieger (1956–1933)
 Édouard Chavannes (1865–1918) – best known for his 1) translations from Sima Qian's Shiji, sections of the Hou Hanshu, and the Weilüe 2) studies of Han dynasty stone carvings and Chinese religion, including the groundbreaking study of the worship of Mount Tai in ancient China.  His students included Henri Maspero, Paul Pelliot and Marcel Granet.
 Paul Pelliot (1878–1945)
 Victor Segalen (1878–1919) – scholar of ancient Chinese sculpture
 Henri Maspero (1883–1945)
 Paul Demiéville – studied the Franco-Belgian school of Buddhology. His 1947 work 'Mirror of the Mind' was widely read in the U.S. and inaugurated a series by him on subitism and gradualism.
 Marcel Granet (1884–1940) – one of the first to use sociological methods
 Jean Escarra (1885–1955)
 René Grousset (1885–1952)
 Étienne Balazs (1905–1963)
 Nicole Vandier-Nicolas (1906–1987)
 Jacques Gernet (1921-2018)
 Jean-Pierre Drège (born 1946)
 François Jullien (born 1951)
 Anne Cheng (born 1955)
 David Gosset (born 1970)
 Corinne Debaine-Francfort (birth date unknown)
 Michel Soymié (1924–2002)
 Joël Bellassen (born 1950)

Germany

 Hans Georg Conon von der Gabelentz (1807–1874) – linguist; author of comprehensive Chinesische Grammatik.
 Herbert Franke (1914–2011) – historian of Liao, Jin, and Yuan dynasties.
 Otto Franke (1863–1946)
 Wolfgang Franke (1912–2007), son of Otto
 Emil Krebs (1867–1930) – Polyglot
 Yu-chien Kuan (1931–2018)
 Wolfgang Kubin (born 1945)
 Walter Liebenthal (1886–1982)
 Klaus Mühlhahn (born 1963)
 Christian Schwarz-Schilling (born 1930)
 Erling von Mende (born 1940)
 Rudolf G. Wagner (born 1941)
 Richard Wilhelm (1873–1930) – his translations of the I Ching and other philosophical works popularized classical Chinese thought throughout the Western World.

Greece

 Dimitri Kitsikis (born 1935) Professor of International Relations and Geopolitics at the University of Ottawa

Hungary

 Ákos Bertalan Apatóczky (born 1974)
Étienne Balazs (1905–1963)
Imre Galambos (born 1967)
Imre Hamar (born 1968)
László Ladány (1914–1990)
Lajos Magyar (1891–1940)
Gábor Kósa (born 1971)
Zsolt Tokaji (born 1971)

India

 Tan Yun-Shan (1898-1983)
 Tan Chung
 Yukteshwar Kumar
 B R Deepak
 Prabodh Chandra Bagchi
 Srikanth Kondapalli
 Jaideep Saikia

Ireland

 Sean Hurley

Italy

 Martino Martini (1614–1661)
 Matteo Ricci (1552–1610)
 Michele Ruggieri (1543–1607)
 Giuseppe Tucci (1894–1984)

Japan

 Masaru Aoki 靑木正兒 (1887–1964)
 Tetsuji Morohashi 諸橋轍次 (1883–1982)
 A. Charles Muller
 D. T. Suzuki 鈴木大拙 (1870–1966)
 Takakusu Junjirō 高楠順次郎 (1866–1945)
 Kōjirō Yoshikawa 吉川幸次郎; 18 March 1904 – 8 April 1980)
 Yoshimi Takeuchi 竹內好 (1910–1977)
 Naitō Torajirō 內藤虎次郎 (1866–1934)
 Fukui Fumimasa 福井文雅 (1934–2017)

Kazakhstan
 Yury Zuev (1932–2006)

Moldova
Nicolae Milescu – Moldavian writer, traveler, geographer, and diplomat who was named ambassador of the Russian Empire to Beijing in 1675.  He submitted to the Foreign Ministry three volumes of notes of his travels through Siberia and China and later Travels through Siberia to the Chinese borders.

Netherlands
 
 J.J.L. Duyvendak (1889–1954)
 Jan Jakob Maria de Groot (1854–1921), scholar of Chinese folk religion
 Robert van Gulik (1910–1967)
 Hans van de Ven

New Zealand

 Rewi Alley

Norway

 Henry Henne (1918–2002)

Poland

 Michał Boym

Portugal

 Gaspar da Cruz (c.1520–1570), author of the first book on China in Western Europe
 Bento de Góis (c.1562–1607), historian from China

Philippines

Alfredo Co

Russia

 Nikita Yakovlevich Bichurin (1775–1853)
 Pyotr Ivanovich Kafarov (1817–1878)
 Evgenij Ivanovich Kychanov (1932–2013)
 Peter A. Boodberg (1903–1972)
 Julian Shchutsky (1897–1938)
 Vasiliy Mikhaylovich Alekseyev (1881–1951)
 Nikolai Iosifovich Konrad (1891–1970)
 Nikolai Fedorenko (1912–2000)
 Vyacheslav Rybakov (born 1954)

Singapore

 Wang Gungwu

Slovenia

 Jana S. Rošker
 Mitja Saje

Spain

 Miguel de Benavides (c. 1552–1605), then based in Spanish Colonial Philippines. (3rd Archbishop of Manila and founder of University of Santo Tomas)
 Juan Cobo (c. 1546–1592), then based in Spanish Colonial Philippines.
 Carmelo Elorduy (1901–1989)
 Juan González de Mendoza (c. 1540–1617), compiler of one of the first European books about China

Sweden

 Göran Malmqvist
 Johan Gunnar Andersson
 Bernhard Karlgren (1889–1978)

Switzerland

 Jean François Billeter
 Léopold de Saussure (1866–1925)

Thailand
 Theraphan Luangthongkum

Turkey
 'Ali Akbar Khata'i, the author of an early book of China (completed in Istanbul in 1516)

United Kingdom

 Edmund Backhouse (1873–1944) 
 Frederick W. Baller
 Robert Bickers
 Derek Bryan (1910–2003)
 Craig Clunas
 Evangeline Edwards (1888–1957)
 Mark Elvin
 Bernhard Fuehrer
 Herbert Giles (1845–1935)
 Lionel Giles (1875–1958)
 A.C. Graham (1919–1991)
 Henrietta Harrison (born 1967)
 David Hawkes (1923–2009)
 Michel Hockx
 Reginald Johnston (1874–1938)
 Gregory B. Lee
 James Legge (1815–1897)
 Michael Loewe
 Roderick MacFarquhar
 Oliver J. Moore
 Joseph Needham (1900–1995)
 Jessica Rawson (born 1943)
 William Edward Soothill (1861–1935)
 Michael Sullivan (born 1916)
 James Summers (1828-1891)
Tian Yuan Tan 
 Paul Thompson (1931–2007)
 Denis C. Twitchett (1925–2006)
 Thomas Francis Wade (1818–1895)
 Andrew West (born 1960)
 Arthur Waley (1889–1966)
 Helen Wang
 Susan Whitfield
 Endymion Wilkinson (born 1941)
 Frances Wood
Edward Harper Parker (1849-1926)

United States

 William Alford
 Sarah Allan
 Robert Ashmore
 Wm. Theodore de Bary
 Timothy Brook
 Derk Bodde (1909–2003)
 James Cahill, art historian
 Wing-tsit Chan (1901–1994)
 Kang-i Sun Chang
 Kwang-chih Chang
 Jonathan Chaves
 Anthony E. Clark
 Jerome Cohen
 Herlee G. Creel (1905–1994)
 Pamela Kyle Crossley
 John DeFrancis (1911–2009)
 Edward L. Dreyer (1940–2007)
 Prasenjit Duara
 Homer H. Dubs
 Mark Elliott
 Mark Elvin
 Joseph Esherick
 John K. Fairbank (1907–1991)
 Courtenay Hughes Fenn
 Henry Courtenay Fenn
 Joshua Fogel
 Gail Hershatter
 David Hinton
 Dale Hoiberg
 Cho-yun Hsu
 Immanuel C.Y. Hsu (1923–2005)
 Ray Huang (Huang Renyu) (1918–2000)
 William Hung (Hong Ye)
 Charles Hucker
 David Keightley
 George A. Kennedy
 David R. Knechtges
 Owen Lattimore
 Mark Edward Lewis
 Li Feng
 Paul Linebarger
 E. Perry Link
 Victor Mair
 Susan L. Mann
 Emily Martin
 Thomas Metzger
 Frederick W. Mote
 Jerry Norman (1936–2012)
 David Nivison
 Stephen Owen
 Peter C. Perdue
 Elizabeth J. Perry
 Andrew H. Plaks
 Carlos Rojas
 Edward H. Schafer
 Stuart R. Schram
 Sidney Shapiro
 Edward L. Shaughnessy
 Nathan Sivin
 Jonathan Spence
 Richard B. Stamps
 Hugh Stimson (1931–2011)
 Laurence Thompson
 Tsien Tsuen-hsuin (T.H. Tsien)
 Tu Wei-ming
 Frederic Wakeman (1937–2006)
 Joanna Waley-Cohen
 Burton Watson
 Stephen H. West
 C. Martin Wilbur
 Karl August Wittfogel (1896–1988)
 R. Bin Wong
 Timothy C. Wong
 Arthur F. Wright (1913–1976)
 Mary C. Wright (1917–1970)
 Yang Lien-sheng(1914–1990)
 Yu Ying-shih (1930–2021)
 Ernest P. Young

Venezuela
 Alfredo Toro Hardy (born 1950)

Notes

References
 
 Zurndorfer, Harriet, "A Brief History of Chinese Studies and Sinology,"  in 

 List of sinologists
Sinologists